The Electric Boogaloo Song is an album by pianist Cedar Walton, which was recorded in 1969 and released on the Prestige label.

Reception

AllMusic reviewed the album, stating: "The Electric Boogaloo Song (1969) continued the high standards of earlier successes like Cedar! and Spectrum, thanks to another strong batch of Walton-penned sides and excellent support musicians."

Track listing 
All compositions by Cedar Walton except as indicated
 "The Electric Boogaloo Song" – 8:15   
 "You Stepped out of a Dream" (Nacio Herb Brown, Gus Kahn) – 7:45   
 "Impressions of Scandinavia" (Clifford Jordan) – 5:08   
 "Sabbatical" – 8:10   
 "Ugetsu" – 5:04

Personnel 
Cedar Walton – piano, electric piano
Blue Mitchell – trumpet
Clifford Jordan – tenor saxophone, flute
Bob Cranshaw – bass
Mickey Roker – drums

Production
Don Schlitten – producer
Dave Jones – engineer

References 

Cedar Walton albums
1969 albums
Prestige Records albums
Albums produced by Don Schlitten